In mathematics, the notion of a quasi-continuous function is similar to, but weaker than, the notion of a continuous function.  All continuous functions are quasi-continuous but the converse is not true in general.

Definition

Let  be a topological space.  A real-valued function  is quasi-continuous at a point  if for any  and any open neighborhood  of  there is a non-empty open set  such that

 

Note that in the above definition, it is not necessary that .

Properties

 If  is continuous then  is quasi-continuous

Example

Consider the function  defined by  whenever  and  whenever .  Clearly f is continuous everywhere except at x=0, thus quasi-continuous everywhere except (at most) at x=0.  At x=0, take any open neighborhood U of x.  Then there exists an open set  such that .  Clearly this yields   thus f is quasi-continuous.

References

 
  

Calculus
Theory of continuous functions